Thomas or Tom McInnes may refer to:

 Thomas Robert McInnes (1840–1904), Canadian politician
 Tom McInnes (footballer, born 1869) (1869–1939), Scottish international footballer for Notts County, Everton, Luton Town and Third Lanark
 Tom McInnes (footballer, born 1873) (1873–1937), Scottish footballer for Nottingham Forest and Lincoln City
 Tom MacInnes (1867–1951), né McInnes, Canadian poet and writer

See also
Tom McInnis (Canadian politician) (born 1945), Canadian politician
Tom McInnis (North Carolina politician) (born 1954), American politician